Yaxi may refer to these places in China:

Yaxi Subdistrict, in Gaochun District, Nanjing, Jiangsu
Yaxi, Shandong, in Rongcheng, Shandong
Yaxi, Zhejiang, in Lishui, Zhejiang